Khorramdeh-e Sharqi (also Romanized as Khorramdeh-e Sharqī; also known as Kharakī-ye Kordhā and Kharakī-ye Kord) is a village in Atrak Rural District, Maneh District, Maneh and Samalqan County, North Khorasan Province, Iran. At the 2006 census, its population was 619, in 148 families.

References 

Populated places in Maneh and Samalqan County